HiCare is an Indian pest control company.

History 
Hicare was founded in 2004 as part of the Godrej Group. Its managing director was Arumugham Mahendran, who had previously founded a mosquito repellent company, Transelektra Domestic Products, which was acquired by Godrej in 1994. Godrej sold an 80% stake in Hicare to the Danish services conglomerate ISS in 2009, and it became a wholly owned subsidiary of ISS in 2013. In 2014, Mahendran left Godrej and, backed by a private equity fund, bought back Hicare from ISS.

In 2017, the company expanded into the house cleaning and air purification markets, in partnership with the Swedish firm Blueair.

Partnership 
In 2014, IVFA formed a partnership with Hicare's founder to make acquisition of the pest control company from Danish multinational ISS Global.

References

External links
 

Pest control companies
Chemical companies established in 2004
Business services companies established in 2004
Service companies of India